The Menemsorae tree frog (Litoria timida) is a species of frog in the subfamily Pelodryadinae, found in New Guinea. Its natural habitats are subtropical or tropical moist lowland forests, swamps, rural gardens, and heavily degraded former forests.

References

Litoria
Amphibians of Papua New Guinea
Amphibians described in 1972
Taxonomy articles created by Polbot